Errol Dyers (29 March 1952 – 21 July 2017) was a South African musician, composer and guitarist and pioneer of Cape jazz/goema.

Career
Dyers came from a musical family but taught himself music playing on the streets of Cape Town, and became known for his pioneering fusion of Cape jazz and goema. He performed alongside numerous other musicians, including Abdullah Ibrahim, Basil 'Manenberg' Coetzee, Robbie Jansen and Winston Mankunku.

Dyer was a member of the Sheer All Stars along with Paul Hanmer, McCoy Mrubata, Sipho Gumede and Frank Paco.

Colleague Molly Baron described him as “a genius” with the guitar and said that “had Errol been born in England or in America he would have been recognised as one of the world’s greatest guitarists.”

Discography (incomplete)
 Sheer All Stars Indibano
 Sheer All Stars Live at the Blue Room
 Abdullah Ibrahim's Mantra Mode with Johnny Mekoa, Basil Coetzee, Robbie Jansen, Spencer Mbadu and Monty Weber.
  Remember – District 6, with Lionel Beukes, Sammy Hartman, Monty Weber, Basil Coetzee;
 All in One with Hilton Schilder and Steve Newman
 Kou Kou Wa

Death
Dyers died of emphysema in Cape Town aged 65.

References 

1952 births
2017 deaths
South African jazz musicians
South African jazz guitarists
Musicians from Cape Town
Respiratory disease deaths in South Africa
Deaths from emphysema